P. lagunensis may refer to:

 Plestiodon lagunensis, a skink native to the Baja California peninsula
 Praemancalla lagunensis, an extinct bird